The Barry Tourist Railway (formerly the Barry Island Railway) is a railway developed to attract visitors to Barry in the Vale of Glamorgan, South Wales. It is a key element of the Barry Rail Centre which also includes engineering and training facilities.

An unusual aspect of the railway is that for several hundred yards across the Causeway from Barry to Barry Island, the trackbed used is directly alongside the Network Rail track which uses the original up line, with the Barry Tourist Railway using the down line. This continues from Barry to cross the Causeway and  Barry Island viaduct after which the two lines diverge into separate platforms at Barry Island. The Railway does not consider itself a line but more of a network as it has two different routes. This is reflected in the map below, with Network Rail shown in red.

In November 2008, the landowner the Vale of Glamorgan Council, undertook a commercial tender exercise, which terminated the lease of previous operator the Vale of Glamorgan Railway in favour of a private operator, Cambrian Transport, under a 20-year-long lease.  Operations commenced in December 2009 and a full year's programme of services operated during 2010. Details are shown on the Council website. Services have been operated by IRIS II DMU (Class 101 twin-set), Class 26 No. 26 038, Class 73s 73 118 & 73 133 with a former Gatwick Express coaching stock set in push-pull mode, Class 20 20 228, Class 08 08 503, 0-6-0 Pannier Tank locomotive No. 9466, Great Western Steam Rail Motor No.93, Metropolitan Tank No.1, Hunslet 0-6-0T Jessie and an 8F tender loco.

History

In 1979, the Butetown Historic Railway Society was formed in Cardiff, running a service along a short section of line from Cardiff Bute Road railway station northwards towards Queen St Station. Evicted by the Cardiff Bay Development Corporation, the company was offered a lease by the Vale of Glamorgan Council on Barry Island railway station, with financial aid from the Welsh Development Agency.

Following the December 2007 decision by landlords, the Vale of Glamorgan Council not to renew the £65,000 per annum funding of the Barry Island Railway, the society maintained its services but subsequently the Council decided to put the railway site out to tender under a long-term lease.  There were three sealed bids submitted with the successful bidder being the commercial company, Cambrian Transport, who had been the Council's railway adviser and contractor since the Barry Railway Project started.

The other bidder NEWCO was submitted by Graham Lee – owner of the LH Plant, Hunslet Engine Company, Statfold Barn Railway – and Mike Thomson – owner of 'Arrowvale' who make "black boxes" for the rail industry.  NEWCO had spoken to the VGR in advance and agreed a method of working together.

Cambrian Transport have operated the railway at Barry since December 2009. It currently operates the line over 30 days per annum and runs many special events.  The biggest annual event for the last 3 years has been the "Barry at War" Weekend, which attracts many thousands of visitors to the town. In August 2014, Cambrian Transport sponsored a display by the Red Arrows and a fly-past by the Battle of Britain Memorial Flight during this event, bringing more people to Barry Island than for many years.

Santa Special trains are also popular during the Christmas period.

Route 
The Barry Tourist Railway is centred at Barry Island railway station and platforms, which is shared with Transport for Wales (TfW) services.   The station is maintained by Cambrian Transport and there is a shop, café and military museum as well as space for event displays and activities. At the west or 'Cardiff' end of the building, is the end of the Network Rail main platform 1 area. Access to the Barry Tourist Railway's used bay platform 4 and part of bay platform 3 (unused and having no track), is at the pier (east) end of the station. An unused section of Platform 1 and also having no track, runs to a point from the east end of the station building towards the Barry Island (or Pier) tunnel. The Barry Island Railway line exits the east end of the station and runs to Plymouth Road where a museum is to be developed. A short canopied platform at the museum building allows visitors to alight and see historic artefacts and exhibits when established whilst a DMU driver changes ends or steam-hauled trains have to run-around. In the past, certain trains ran through Barry Island station and a 280-yard tunnel to Barry Pier to connect with P&A Campbell's paddle steamer sailings in the Bristol Channel. At the moment the tunnel is blocked off and used as a shooting range. The former single track falling at 1 in 80 to the tunnel was lifted after 1976 and the inclined trackbed now serves as a metalled access road to the tunnel. The railway has long-term ambitions to reopen the tunnel and route to Barry Pier.

Heading west from Barry Island station, the Barry Tourist Railway's single line crosses the  Barry Island double-line viaduct shared with Network Rail, before making a tight right-hand curve and splitting into two branches, one dropping down to Hood Road, (the Waterfront) the first section to be opened on a totally new inclined formation, the other heading past the former Barry Railway Co's steam shed and on to Woodham Halt and thence to the new terminus at Gladstone Bridge adjacent to Morrison's supermarket and a retail centre. It is intended to extend the line a further half mile to a site alongside Arriva Trains Wales’ Barry Docks Station, where an interchange will be provided and where by 2013, a Park & Ride facility had been provided.

The running line runs near to the site of the former Woodham Brothers scrapyard which by April 2015 was under intense development as a new housing complex and by 13 April 2015, a new ASDA superstore had been built and opened, all on the site of what was known in railway terms as 'West Pond' before being completely backfilled. The Waterfront terminus is alongside the old Barry Railway Co's Hood Road goods shed and also conveniently situated near a new Premier Inn and Brewers Fayre establishment opened in 2014 at the south-western end of Barry No.1 dock. The Waterfront platform and terminus also lies opposite the old Barry Railway Co's Hydraulic pumphouse and electrical generating building, now a listed structure and as at August 2015, was undergoing extensive internal and external refurbishment and bore vertically lettered identities placed on two sides of its taper square chimney, one face stating PUMPHOUSE and the other TY PWMP, but the correct circumflex above the letter Y has been omitted. The former Barry Railway Co's Loco shed at Barry, opened in 1888 and at the GWR 1922 grouping, stabled 148 engines, all re-numbered by the GWR. As at September 1947 and nationalisation of the railways, Barry shed had a complement of 85 steam locomotives. It closed to steam engines in September 1964. Before being taken over by the Vale of Glamorgan Council in the 1990s, the shed and outbuildings had finally served as an EWS wagon repair centre but is now the main running shed and is also used to store and repair rolling stock.  This site has recently been renamed Barry Main Depôt by Cambrian Transport.

Some parts of the line, particularly around the Plymouth Road/Barry Island and Barry Town area, were used for several scenes in the Doctor Who episodes "The Empty Child" and "The Doctor Dances" in January 2005 and more recently for the episode "Flatline" screened in October 2014. Other recent filming includes Being Human, Ar-y-Tracs and "Stella (UK TV series)" – the last two featuring Ruth Jones.

By July 2014, the Network Rail connection to the BTR infrastructure at Barry was completely remodelled, coincident with the commissioning of the new Network Rail re-signalling project and closure of Barry signal box, the latter being demolished on the weekend of 28–29 March 2015.

Rolling stock
Stock marked with an asterisk (*) is located at the Barry Main Depot. On most running days, guided shed tours are offered by the railway.

Steam locomotives 

The last locomotives to leave Dai Woodham's scrapyard, were the remains of the vast number of locomotives left when the yard closed – and as there were ten of them, were a group often called the Barry Ten. Most of them have been removed for use in heritage railway projects and for restoration elsewhere. Two of the Barry Ten steam locomotives remained on the railway, though they were rejoined by a third member in 2014, and are publicly viewable on most operating days. They comprise an 0-6-2 Collett tank engine and a 2-10-0 tender locomotive, both partly disassembled. 

Sentinel Waggon Works  No. 9537 "Susan"* built in 1952. – (Operational, arrived from the South Devon Railway in August 2015).
BR  Class 9F No. 92245* built in 1959. – (Stored and located by the main depot. Due to be displayed as an example of an unrestored ex-Barry scrapyard engine).

At the Barry New Works Building located adjacent to Woodham Halt are two locos undergoing restoration
GWR  4575 Class No. 5539 built in 1928. – (owned by Hugh Shipton)
GWR  5600 Class No. 6686 built in 1928. – (owned by Barry Tourist Railway Director, John Buxton).

Also on site are the following:

Diesel locomotives
BR  Class 08 No. 08 503* – Operational.
BR Class 20 Class 20 No. 20 228* (CFD No. 2004) – Non-operational but under overhaul (2015). – Owned by Steve Madge).

Diesel Multiple Units
BR Class 101 unit (Iris II)* – Operational and owned by Cambrian Transport. Formed of RDS 977963+RDB 977964.
BR Class 101 DTCL 6300* – stored, owned by Cambrian Transport – some work carried out to restore this coach as an observation vehicle.

Electro-Diesel locomotives
BR Class 73 Class 73 No. 73 118* – Operational and operated by Transmart Trains

Electric Multiple Unit trailers
BR Class 488/2 unit 8206 (72505+72629)*
BR Class 488/3 unit 8311 (72620+72710+72621)
BR Class 489 unit 9110 (68509)*

Other rolling stock includes:-

DW139 Great Western Toplight Coach 2360 of 1911
HAA Hopper wagon
Bogie Bolster wagon
2 Grampus Wagons
Covered air-braked wagon (Cov AB)
Ex LNER Permanent Way Brake Van (Privately owned, under restoration by private owners)

The plan is to acquire further wagons to make up two rakes of wagons – one vacuum-braked and one air-braked set.

References

External links

 

Heritage railways in the Vale of Glamorgan
Barry, Vale of Glamorgan
Standard gauge railways in Wales